The Society of General Internal Medicine (SGIM) is an American professional society composed of physicians engaged in internal medicine research and teaching. It was originally named "The Society for Research and Education in Primary Care Internal Medicine" (SREPCIM), at its inaugural meeting in 1978.  Startup funding was provided by the Robert Wood Johnson Foundation awarded to the American College of Physicians. In 1988, it was renamed. SGIM publishes the Journal of General Internal Medicine. By 2012, SGIM had over 3400 members.

See also
General Internal Medicine
Primary care
Medical education

References

External links
Official website

Medical associations based in the United States
Organizations based in Alexandria, Virginia
Internal medicine
Medical and health organizations based in Virginia
Organizations established in 1978
1978 establishments in the United States